Padayottam is a 1982 Indian Malayalam-language epic period drama film directed by Jijo Punnoose and produced by Navodaya Appachan through the company Navodaya Pictures. It is partly based on the 1844 novel The Count of Monte Cristo by Alexandre Dumas who is credited for story with screenplay written by N. Govindan Kutty. The film stars Prem Nazir, Madhu, Lakshmi, Shankar, Poornima Bhagyaraj, Mammootty, Mohanlal, N. Govindan Kutty and Thikkurissy Sukumaran Nair, It is the first 70mm film in South India.

Plot
The Kolathiri Raja is a prosperous ruler of Northern Kerala. Prince Udayan, Raja's second nephew, is handsome, brave and intelligent than Prince Devan, Raja's elder nephew. The King named Udayan as his successor to the throne in accordance to matrilineal traditions along with marriage of his daughter Princess Parvathi, who was in deep love with Udayan. This has dashed the hopes of Devan, who secretly longed to marry Parvathi.

On the other hand, two nobles of the court, Kammaran and Perumana Kuruppu were upset by Udayan's ascension. Cashing on Devan's frustrations, Kammaran made Prince Devan against Prince Udayan. For this, Kammaran used Kompan, a dacoit leader who were frequent raiders in many villages, to stage a royal pardon, sought presence of Prince Udayan in his position as Crown Prince for signing the peace treaty. Without knowing as a trap laid by Kammaran and Kuruppu, Udayan drove to Kompan's camp, only to fall in the trap laid. However, news flashed in the country as Prince Udayan betrayed Kolathiri Raja and killed some of the Raja's men. This made the Raja furious, who declared Udayan as a traitor and cancelled the marriage.

Kompan instructs his men to kill Udayan. However, they decided to sell him as a slave to a cruel captain. While as a slave, he meets another slave, Kunjali, from whom he learnt the death of Kolathiri Raja and his queen at Arakkal Ali Raja's boat by forces arranged by Kammaran and Kompan. Ali Raja tried to save the Kolathiri Raja and his queen, but was killed by Perumana Kuruppu. Kunjali, the trusted slave however saved Ali Raja's daughter, Lalia, with the help of his men. However, he could not escape himself from the Kompan's men, who sold him to slavery. From Kunjali, Udayan learned where the treasures of Ali Raja and his daughter were taken to. In the meantime, Prince Devan married Princess Parvathi and became the new Kolathiri Raja. However, the Royal crown and sceptre were missing.

After some years, Udayan and his fellow slaves staged a mutiny in the ship, killing the captain and releasing themselves. Udayan ran away, became a rich merchant after finding the lost treasures of Ali Raja and his daughter Lalia. Both decided to make a return to Kolathirinadu in disguise to make their revenge. They return to the Kolathiri Kingdom in a floating palace as an Arab merchant and princess. Years made people to forget Udayan and no one was able to recognize him in his new attire and lifestyle, except Queen Parvathi, who understood him just at a glimpse.

King Devan and Queen Parvathi's son Prince Chandran fell in love with Laila.  Meanwhile, Udayan was hatching a plot to trap Perumana Kuruppu, after learning that the crown and sceptre of Kolathiri Raja were in his custody, as King Devan declared it missing. Udayan approached Perumana Kuruppu and let him know that he is interested in purchasing rare jewels and crowns, at an astronomical price which lured Kuruppu to bring out from its secret place. However, he was caught red-handed by the public and brought before trial. At the trial, he declared that the old Raja had given the crown and staff to him, for attempting to rescue the king from attack and he challenged the prosecutors that they have no evidence against him for betrayal and robbery. It was at this moment Lalia enters into court room to declare her true identity as Princess Laila – the heir apparent of Ali Raja  and presented herself as sole eyewitness to the incident. This made Perumana Kuruppu to kill himself.

Udayan's second target was Kammaran. Kammaran is the new finance minister of the state. The kingdom was facing extreme financial crisis due to mismanagement and corruption. Kammaran advises the king to seek financial assistance from the visiting Arab prince and he pays a visit at the Udayan's palace to seek finance without understanding his true identity. Udayan refused to finance rather says that he would finance if Kammaran becomes king. This offer made Kammaran greedy and he hatches a plan to trap Devan similar to the way by which he trapped Udayan earlier. In the meantime, Udayan double-crosses Kammaran by sending a message to the Devan directly that he is ready to finance. This made Devan suspicious of Kammaran and secretly through his spies he understands the plot his close friend Kammaran made to trap him.

Kammaran repeats the old strategy with assistance of the Kompan  who asked the king to come directly with a tribute in order to prevent an attack. However, understanding the trap, Devan comes with a chest with soldiers hiding inside and they attack Kammaran and Kompan in surprise. While Devan orders his forces to arrest Kammaran, he escapes, finding himself under custody of Udayan. After discovering his true identity, Udayan's soldiers fire at Kammaran.

Udayan's final revenge is now against Devan and he was planning on that. In the meantime, Prince Chandran through his close friend Kannan who was Kammaran's son discovered Udayan's double cross. He understood it was Udayan who spoiled the relationships between Kammaran and Devan and challenged Udayan to a public duel, which Udayan accepts.

Prince Chandran is asked by Queen Parvathi not to participate in the duel with Udayan. He questioned his mother and Parvathi says it is a result of Devan's sins. Chandran surrenders to Udayan while at the duel. Hearing his son's surrender without a fight made King Devan furious who went to Udayan's palace to challenge him. It was there, for first time after his betrayal, Devan saw Udayan, which made him to fall down.

Devan returns home and Chandran questions his father about past sins. Parvathi tells Chandran not to question his father and meets Udayan to inform that Devan has paid for his sins by raising up Chandran despite of knowing that he was actually the son of Udayan. This made Udayan to forget his revenge and he forgives Devan.  Meanwhile, Kompan raided the palace. As the king had fallen and attack was unexpected, the Kolathiri forces were overrun by the Kompan raiders. However, timely intervention of Udayan's army killed Kompan and all his men. Udayan hands over his stepdaughter Lalia to Parvathi and is shown walking away.

Cast

 Prem Nazir as Udayan, Kolathiri Raja's second nephew handsome, brave and intelligent. Younger brother of Devan and biological and step father of Chandran and Laila respectively.
 Madhu as Devan, Eldest nephew of Kolathiri Raja and elder brother of Udayan. Later the king, husband of Queen Parvathy and step-father of Chandran. The film marks the first collaboration of Madhu and Mohanlal.
 Lakshmi as Parvathi, daughter of Kolathiri Raja, wife of Devan and mother of Chandran.
 Shankar as Prince Chandran, son of Udayan and Parvathy and Devan's stepson who fall in love with Laila.
 Poornima Bhagyaraj as Laila, Ali Raja's daughter and Udayan's stepdaughter
 Mohanlal as Kannan Son of Kamaran and friend of Chandran. 
 Mammootty as Kamaran Kannan's father
 N. Govindan Kutty as Perumana Kurup
 Jalaja as Aiysha
 Sathaar
 Thikkurussi Sukumaran Nair as Kolathiri Raja
 Pappu as Pokkan
 Nellikkode Bhaskaran as Kunjali
 G. K. Pillai as Padathalavan, Commander
 Achankunju as Kapithan, slave ship captain
 Alummoodan as Udayanan's helper
 Sukumari as Chiruthevi Thampuratti
 Balan K. Nair as Marakkar
 Ceylon Manohar as Kompan
 Alummoodan
 Paravoor Bharathan as Mammootty
 Kothuku Nanappan 
 Haseena Aman as Slave girl

Production
Padayottam was a big-budget film with a production cost of 1 crore when an the average cost for a Malayalam film was  15 lakh at that time, making it the most-expensive Malayalam film made until then. When Padayottam was made only three films were made in 70 mm in India with all of them processed in London and all three were Hindi films. Padayottam, originally shot with a 35 mm camera was magnified to 70 mm in a lab in Madras, making it the first indigenous made 70 mm film in India.

Soundtrack
The music was composed by Guna Singh with lyrics by Kavalam Narayana Panicker.

Reception
The film was released in India during the Onam festival of Kerala on 1 September 1982. It was a blockbuster at the box office and became the highest-grossing Malayalam film of the time. However, the film was not a profitable venture due to its high production costs.

References

External links 
 
 70mm Film in India

1982 films
1980s Malayalam-language films
Films based on The Count of Monte Cristo
Films produced by Navodaya Appachan